Amphiroa is a genus of thalloid red algae under the family Corallinaceae.

Taxonomy and nomenclature 
Amphiroa was first described by Jean Vincent Félix Lamouroux in 1812 with the type species for the genus being Amphiroa tribulus. This genus was named after Amphiro, a sea nymph in the epic poem of Theogony by the Greek poet Hesiod. There is currently 72 accepted species names for this genus.

Morphology 
Amphiroa is composed of an erect thallus that is attached to the substrate with an insconspicous crustose base and possess mature branches differentiated into alternating areas  calcified intergenicula and uncalcified genicula that is composed of more than cell layer and does not exhibit any dimerous flange-like branches. Specimens can reach around 30 cm in size. The thalli take a crustose form; dichotomous branches are formed. The organisms possess secondary pit connections. Amphiroa reproduces by means of conceptacles; it produces tetraspores. Its pore canals are lined with parallel filaments; the morphology of the pore canal is a key trait used to delineate species within the genus.

Distribution 
Amphiroa is a cosmopolitan genus inhabiting the tropics up to the temperate regions.

Ecology 
This genus is found from the intertidal down to the subtidal areas of the reef.

Life history 
Amphiroa exhibit a triphasic life cycle, however, their tetrasporangia, spermatangia, and carposporangia are borne out of a specialized organ called a conceptacle. This triphasic cycle involves the production of tetraspores (N) from the tetrasporophyte (2N) and the subsequent development of the tetraspores into either the male or female gametophyte (N); resulting spermatium produced by the male gametophyte is later on trapped by the trichogyne of the female gametophyte leading to their eventual fusion and development of the carposporophyte (2N); the cycle is complete when the carpospores (2N) are released and develops into the next set of tetrasporophytes.

Exploitation, harvesting and cultivation 
Amphiroa species are unpalatable due to its thallus being highly calcified and thus there is no immediate cultivation and use for the seaweed.

Chemical composition and natural products chemistry 
Amphiroa contains several bioactive compounds similar to other seaweeds, for example, the ellagic acid, gallic acid, and phenolic compounds within A. anceps has shown to be a potential anti-fungal agent, moreover, addition of A. fragilissima polysaccharides have shown to improve the gut of farmed shrimp.

Utilization and management 
This genus is currently not being utilized and managed on a commercial scale due to a lack of culture technology.

Species 

The valid species currently considered to belong to this genus are:

 Amphiroa anastomosans Weber Bosse
 Amphiroa anceps (Lamarck) Decaisne
 Amphiroa annobonensis Pilger
 Amphiroa annulata Me.Lemoine
 Amphiroa articulata (Bory) Athanasiadis
 Amphiroa beauvoisii J.V.Lamouroux
 Amphiroa bowerbankii Harvey
 Amphiroa brasiliana Decaisne
 Amphiroa breviarticulata Areschoug
 Amphiroa canaliculata G.Martens
 Amphiroa capensis Areschoug
 Amphiroa compressa M.Lemoine
 Amphiroa crassa J.V.Lamouroux
 Amphiroa crosslandii M.Lemoine
 Amphiroa crustiformis E.Y.Dawson
 Amphiroa cryptarthrodia Zanardini
 Amphiroa cumingii Montagne
 Amphiroa currae Ganesan
 Amphiroa dimorpha Me.Lemoine  
 Amphiroa echigoensis Yendo
 Amphiroa ephedraea (Lamarck) Decaisne
 Amphiroa exilis Harvey
 Amphiroa foliacea J.V.Lamouroux
 Amphiroa fragilissima (Linnaeus) J.V.Lamouroux
 Amphiroa franciscana W.R.Taylor
 Amphiroa galapagensis W.R.Taylor
 Amphiroa gracilis Harvey
 Amphiroa hancockii W.R.Taylor
 Amphiroa howensis A.H.S.Lucas
 Amphiroa irregularis Kützing
 Amphiroa itonoi Srimanobhas & Masaki
 Amphiroa klochkovana A.S.Harvey, W.J.Woelkerling & A.J.K.Millar
 Amphiroa kuetzingiana Trevisan
 Amphiroa magdalenensis E.Y.Dawson
 Amphiroa maletractata Simonsen
 Amphiroa minutissima W.R.Taylor
 Amphiroa misakiensis Yendo 
 Amphiroa nodularia (Pallas) Decaisne
 Amphiroa nodulosa Kützing
 Amphiroa pacifica Kützing
 Amphiroa peruana Areschoug ex W.R.Taylor
 Amphiroa polymorpha M.Lemoine
 Amphiroa prefragilissima Me.Lemoine
 Amphiroa pusilla Yendo
 Amphiroa rigida J.V.Lamouroux
 Amphiroa rubra (Philippi) Woelkerling
 Amphiroa setacea Kützing
 Amphiroa subcylindrica E.Y.Dawson
 Amphiroa taylorii E.Y.Dawson
 Amphiroa tribulus (J.Ellis & Solander) J.V.Lamouroux  - type
 Amphiroa ungulata Montagne & Millardet
 Amphiroa valonioides Yendo
 Amphiroa vanbosseae Me.Lemoine
 Amphiroa yendoi Børgesen
 Amphiroa yendoi De Toni

References

External links 

Images of Amphiroa at Algaebase

Corallinaceae
Red algae genera